The name June was used for seven tropical cyclones in the Pacific Ocean.

Typhoon June (1954) (T5412) - hit Japan (ja)
Typhoon June (1958) (T5823) - crossed into the Central Pacific basin briefly
Tropical Storm June (1964) (T6413, 17W, Toyang)
Typhoon June (1969) (T6917, 20W, Pining)
Tropical Storm June (1972), formed in the Central Pacific 
Typhoon June (1975) (T7523, 23W, Rosing)
Typhoon June (1981) (T8105, 06W, Kuring)
Typhoon June (1984) (T8412, 14W, Maring)

Pacific typhoon set index articles
Pacific hurricane set index articles